Frank Muller (September 10, 1862 – April 19, 1917) was an American astronomer.

From 1885 he worked in the Leander McCormick Observatory as an assistant to Ormond Stone and Francis Preserved Leavenworth.

He discovered ~100 astronomical objects, from NGC catalog and Index catalog, for example NGC 17 in 1886.

References

External links 
 Frank Muller bei Wolfgang Steinicke
 Veröffentlichungen von Frank Muller im Astrophysics Data System

19th-century American astronomers
20th-century American astronomers
1862 births
1917 deaths